Las Veguillas is a village and municipality in the province of Salamanca,  western Spain, part of the autonomous community of Castile-Leon.

Geography

See also
List of municipalities in Salamanca

References

Municipalities in the Province of Salamanca